Plinlimmon Farm is a historic home and farm complex located at Owings Mills, Baltimore County, Maryland.  It is an early 19th-century farmhouse of log construction clad in novelty siding. It is composed of six irregularly spaced bays, one room deep, and two and a half stories high with a gable roof.  Also on the property is a stone building with a gable roof built about 1850, a frame two-bay garage, a small rectangular smokehouse built about 1850, a large mid-19th century cornhouse, and an early 20th-century frame barn.

It was listed on the National Register of Historic Places in 1983.

References

External links
, including photo from 1982, at Maryland Historical Trust

Houses on the National Register of Historic Places in Maryland
Houses in Baltimore County, Maryland
Houses completed in 1839
Buildings and structures in Owings Mills, Maryland
National Register of Historic Places in Baltimore County, Maryland